John Matkin (born 20 April 1986 in San Diego, California) is an American-born Guamanian footballer who plays as a midfielder who played for UiTM F.C. and currently for Guam national football team.

Career

United Sikkim
On 8 January 2013 it was officially announced that Landa had signed with United Sikkim F.C. in the I-League until the end of the 2012-13 I-League. Landa then made his debut for the club in the I-League the next day on 9 January 2013 against Mumbai F.C. at home at the Paljor Stadium in which he came on as a 73rd-minute substitute for Nadong Bhutia as United Sikkim drew the match 2–2.

International
Due to his heritage Matkin was able to represent the United States, Mexico, and Guam. After seeing that his chances of playing for the United States and Mexico fell short he decided to accept Guam's offer to be called up to represent them during the 2014 AFC Challenge Cup qualifiers to be held on 2 March 2013. Matkin then made his debut for Guam on 2 March 2013 against Myanmar in the first match of the qualifiers in which he started and played the full 90 minutes as Guam lost the match 5–0.

International goals
Scores and results list Guams's goal tally first.

References

1986 births
Living people
Soccer players from San Diego
I-League players
American people of Mexican descent
Association football midfielders
American expatriate sportspeople in Japan
Expatriate footballers in India
American soccer players
Guamanian footballers
Guam international footballers
Matkin
United Sikkim F.C. players
American expatriate soccer players